HPO Center (registered name: Center for Organizational Performance BV) is a small management consultancy firm, originated in Hilversum, Netherlands, in December 2007 as a result of a number of round-table talks with non-profit and profit organizations, such as Unilever, ABN AMRO, IKEA and Shell Downstream, during which performance management and a scientific study into High Performance Organizations (HPOs) by Dr. André de Waal were discussed. 

The results of these discussions enabled the HPO Center to build a bridge between this scientific HPO study and its application in practice. The HPO Center was founded as a research and management consultancy center, based on the five factors with a direct correlation to competitive performance and that ensure that an organization is – and remains – an HPO (High Performance Organization).
These characteristics were then used to develop the HPO diagnosis, which supports organizations to evaluate their current HPO status and indicates what they need to do in order to become an excellent organization. 
Since 2008, new scientific and practical research into High Performance Managers, High Performance Partnerships and High Performance Employees was started by the HPO Center.

Research and consulting topics

High Performance Organization (HPO)
Over a period of five years (2003 – 2007) 290 academic and management publications in the area of high performance and excellence were studied by dr. André A. de Waal, academic director of the HPO, in order to be able to build the HPO Framework. From these literature’s sources characteristics of high performance were distilled and put in an HPO Questionnaire which was distributed worldwide. Thousands of respondents from 1470 organizations in 50 countries filled in this questionnaire in which they indicated how their organization scored on these characteristics and performed against their peer groups. Subsequent statistical analysis of the collected data showed that there are 35 characteristics that have a direct positive relation with competitive performance. These characteristics always appear in five groups, the so-called HPO Factors (Quality of Management, Openness & Action Orientation, Long-Term Orientation, Continuous Improvement & Renewal and Quality of Employees). When an organization scores higher on these five HPO Factors than its peer group, than it performs financially and non-financially also better than the peer group.
The HPO research was validated by Dr. Veronica Martinez of Cranfield University.

Definition of an HPO
According to dr. De Waal the definition of an HPO is: “A High Performance Organization is an organization that achieves financial and non-financial results that are exceedingly better than those of its peer group over a period of time of five years or more, by focusing in a disciplined way on that which really matters to the organization.”
 The contemporary high performance organization model acts as an alternative to the earlier model known as Taylorism, or scientific management, which mainly focuses on improving efficiency and productivity.

High Performance Manager (HPM)
The research into the characteristics of high performing managers (HPMs) is based on a sample of 808 Dutch managers and a sample in the UK consisted of employees of the ATLAS Consortium , a consortium of five ICT companies that were charged with improving the information and communication technology infrastructure of the British Ministry of Defence. Most of these employees were based in England, and using the cross-cultural framework of Excellent Leadership by Selvarajah et al., the profile of an excellent Dutch and British High Performance Manager was derived.
This profile can be described by a five-dimensional factor structure consisting of: (1) Excellent Leadership; (2) Managerial Behaviors; (3) Environmental Influences; (4) Personal Qualities; and (5) Organizational Demands. The results of the research have significant practical implications in that organizations can use the profile to tailor their management development programs, evaluation and coaching programs, and recruiting processes.
The above research showed that the framework for HPM is valid for both the Dutch and British context. The research results indicate that the five-factor structure is a sound representation of data, portraying reliable factors that are important to characterize Dutch and British HPMs.

High Performance Partnership (HPP)
The importance of partnerships to organizational success has increased considerably the past decennia and many organizations strive at creating high performance partnerships (HPPs). For this to happen, organizations in the partnerships have to be of high quality and their collaborations should be world-class. Whereas the factors that make up high performance organizations (HPO) are well established, the HPP factors are still unclear. This research develops a scale for measuring HPP factors. Based on empirical research at a cable company and its suppliers (a total of 239 filled-in questionnaires were received back, 46 from the cable company and on average 48 per supplier.), a HPP Framework was developed consisting of nine HPP characteristic: Control, Trust, Commitment, Coordination, Interdependence, Communication, Conflict, Valuing and Diversity. 
This framework is then tested at the ATLAS Consortium. The results of the application of the HPP framework in such a complicated environment are evaluated and the HPP framework is finalized.
The research results show a strong relationship between HPP factors, HPO factors and the success factors of a partnership. This research adds to the literature by extending the concept of HPOs to the value chain these HPOs operate in. The practical benefit is that managers can use the HPP factors to increase their partnership quality.

Publications

Books by the HPO Center
What Makes A High Performance Organization: Five Factors of Competitive Advantage that Apply Worldwide.  London [England]: Global Professional Publishing, 2012. . .
 Maak van je bedrijf een toporganisatie. Culemborg: Van Duuren Management, 2008. .
 Hoe bouw je een High Performance Organisatie. Culemborg: Van Duuren Management, 2013. .
 Animal Firm: Haal het beste dierengedrag in uzelf en uw team naar boven. Culemborg: Van Duuren Management, 2010. .

Managerial articles
Do Bonuses Matter? They Do If Part of a Fair and Equitable Rewards System

The High Performance Organization: Is it Being Driven by HR or the CFO?

4 Ways to Encourage Continuous Improvement & Renewal at Your Organization

Leadership Practices at High Performance Organizations

Becoming a high performance organization

Management fads that waste time and money

Scientific articles
Lessons learned from performance management systems implementations

Comparing Dutch and British high performing managers

References

External links
 HPO Center

Consulting firms established in 2007
Dutch companies established in 2007
Management consulting firms of the Netherlands
Organisations based in North Holland
Hilversum